Thirupadiripuliyur railway station (code: TDPR) is one of the two railway stations serving the town of Cuddalore, headquarters of the Cuddalore district in Tamil Nadu, India, the other one being . It comes under the Tiruchirappalli railway division of the Southern Railway zone.

Location and layout
The railway station is located off the Subbrayalu Nagar, Thirupapuliyur, Cuddalore.

Lines

References

External links
 

Trichy railway division
Railway stations in Cuddalore district